Harris bin Mohd Salleh (born 4 November 1930) is a Malaysian politician who served as the 6th Chief Minister of Sabah from June 1976 to April 1985. During his tenure, he controversially ceded the island of Labuan, which used to be part of the state of Sabah, to the federal Government, making it the second federal territory of Malaysia. He was also founding President of the Sabah People's United Front (BERJAYA).

Honours

Honours of Malaysia
  : 
  Commander of the Order of the Defender of the Realm (PMN) – Tan Sri (2011)
  :
  (1968, returned 1986)
  :
  Knight Grand Commander of the Order of the Crown of Johor (SPMJ) – Dato' (1980)
  :
  Knight Grand Commander of the Order of the Life of the Crown of Kelantan (SJMK) – Dato' (1984)
  :
  Grand Knight of the Order of Sultan Ahmad Shah of Pahang (SSAP) – Dato' Sri (1981)
  :
  Knight Grand Commander of the Order of the Crown of Selangor (SPMS) – Dato' Seri (1980)
  :
  Knight Commander of the Order of the Star of Hornbill Sarawak (DA) – Datuk Amar (1980)

References

Other
 Rafaelle, Paul. "Harris Salleh of Sabah", Condor Publishing, Hong Kong (1986). 

Chief Ministers of Sabah
Sabah state ministers
1930 births
Malaysian people of Pakistani descent
Living people
People from Sabah
Malaysian people of Malay descent
Malaysian Muslims
Members of the Dewan Rakyat
Malaysian people of Bruneian descent
Members of the Sabah State Legislative Assembly
Malaysian political party founders
Sabah People's United Front politicians
United Sabah National Organisation politicians
Commanders of the Order of the Defender of the Realm
Knights Grand Commander of the Order of the Crown of Johor
Knights Grand Commander of the Order of the Crown of Selangor
Knights Commander of the Order of the Star of Hornbill Sarawak